ISO 3166-2:IS is the entry for Iceland in ISO 3166-2, part of the ISO 3166 standard published by the International Organization for Standardization (ISO), which defines codes for the names of the principal subdivisions (e.g., provinces or states) of all countries coded in ISO 3166-1.

Currently for Iceland, ISO 3166-2 codes are defined for 8 regions and 64 municipalities.

Each code consists of two parts, separated by a hyphen.

Current codes
Subdivision names are listed as in the ISO 3166-2 standard published by the ISO 3166 Maintenance Agency (ISO 3166/MA).

Regions

Municipalities

Changes
The following changes to the entry are listed on ISO's online catalogue, the Online Browsing Platform:

See also
Administrative divisions of Iceland
FIPS region codes of Iceland
NUTS statistical regions of Iceland

External links
ISO Online Browsing Platform: IS
Regions of Iceland, Statoids.com

2:IS
ISO 3166-2
Iceland geography-related lists